Hogar CREA is an international drug rehabilitation institution founded in Puerto Rico. It is often referred to in the plural, Hogares CREA.

History
In 1968, José Juan García founded Hogar CREA. The acronym is for a Spanish phrase,  meaning 'community for the re-education of addicts';  is also a word meaning 'creates', and  translates to 'Home Creates'.

Those who enter the program do not have to pay a fee, but must agree to the program's strict rules. Breaking a drug habit is not easy and those who enter the program must adopt new habits which the program promotes as conducive to recovery.

Participants were required to attend church services on Sundays until a court ruling changed that. Participants are known for selling desserts such as caramel custards. They also wash cars and do community service. The program is funded by both the United States federal government and the Puerto Rican government.

Hogares CREA has over 152 facilities worldwide. Besides Puerto Rico, facilities are also established in Florida, Costa Rica, Venezuela, Colombia, Dominican Republic, Panama, El Salvador, Honduras, and Nicaragua.

Gallery

References

External links

Drug and alcohol rehabilitation centers
Medical and health organizations based in Puerto Rico
1968 establishments in Puerto Rico